Athroismeae is a tribe of flowering plants in the subfamily Asteroideae of the family Asteraceae.

Athroismeae genera recognized by the Global Compositae Database as of April 2022:
Anisochaeta 
Anisopappus 
Artemisiopsis 
Athroisma 
Blepharispermum 
Cardosoa 
Centipeda 
Leucoblepharis 
Philyrophyllum 
Welwitschiella

References

 
Asteraceae tribes